Francis Thomas (1799–1876) was an American politician and Governor of Maryland.

Francis Thomas may also refer to:

Francis A. Thomas (1826–1899), American physician and New York City politician
Francis Wolferstan Thomas (1834–1900), Canadian banker and philanthropist
Frank Thomas (bishop) (1930–1988), English prelate of the Roman Catholic Church
Francis Xavier Thomas (1906−1985), Australian Roman Catholic bishop

See also
Frank Thomas (disambiguation)

Thomas Francis (disambiguation)
Funmilayo Ransome-Kuti (Frances Abigail Olufunmilayo Thomas, 1900−1978), Nigerian chieftain, feminist and politician